Adur is a local government district of West Sussex, England. It is named after its main river and is historically part of the English county of Sussex. The council is based in Shoreham-by-Sea and the district has a population of 59,627 according to the 2001 census.

It was created on 1 April 1974 by the merger of Southwick and Shoreham urban districts and the civil parishes of Coombes, Lancing and Sompting from Worthing Rural District.

Sompting, Lancing, Shoreham-by-Sea (or Shoreham) and Southwick form a strip of settlements on the south coast, between Worthing and Brighton and Hove collectively known as the Brighton/Worthing/Littlehampton conurbation. Coombes is inland. Fishersgate and Kingston by Sea (also known as Kingston Buci) are also small areas in the south east of the district.

Shoreham Airport is located in the Adur district, west of Shoreham-by-Sea and just east of Lancing.

The Adur festival is held in the first two weeks of June every year.

Politics

Elections to the district council have been held every 2 years since the 2004 election, when the council changed to being elected by halves instead of by thirds. The Conservative Party has had a majority on the council since the 2002 election. Following the 2021 election the council is composed of the following:

Joint administration with Worthing Borough Council

Since 2008 Adur District Council has worked in partnership with Worthing Borough Council, as Adur and Worthing Councils, sharing a joint management structure, with a single Chief Executive.

Sports clubs
Lancing F.C.
Shoreham F.C.
Southwick F.C.
Lancing Utd F.C.

Twin towns
Adur is twinned with
  Żywiec, Poland
  Riom, France

Climate
Climate in this area has mild differences between highs and lows, and there is adequate rainfall year-round.  The Köppen Climate Classification subtype for this climate is "Cfb" (Marine West Coast Climate/Oceanic climate).

See also
Adur and Worthing Councils
Listed buildings in Adur
List of places of worship in Adur
Lancing
Shoreham-by-Sea
Southwick
Sompting

References

External links
 Adur District Council
 A record of all the election results in Adur District since its creation until 2012

 
Non-metropolitan districts of West Sussex